The 20th Online Film Critics Society, honoring the best in film for 2016, were announced on December 27, 2016.

Nominees

References

2016 film awards
2016